George Edmund Clarke (24 April 1921 – 17 February 2011) was an English professional footballer who played as a centre half.

Career
Clarke made 34 appearances for Ipswich Town in the Football League between 1946 and 1953, scoring one goal. He also made 3 Cup appearances for the Ipswich first-team, as well as over 200 games for the reserve side.

Later life and death
Clarke died on 17 February 2011, at the age of 89.

References

1921 births
2011 deaths
English footballers
Ipswich Town F.C. players
English Football League players
Footballers from Suffolk
Sportspeople from Ipswich
Association football central defenders